The 2010 BH Telecom Indoors was a professional tennis tournament played on indoor hard courts. It was part of the 2010 ATP Challenger Tour. It took place in Sarajevo, Bosnia and Herzegovina between 8 and 14 March 2010.

ATP entrants

Seeds

Rankings are as of March 1, 2010.

Other entrants
The following players received wildcards into the singles main draw:
  Mirza Bašić
  Tomislav Brkić
  Ismar Gorčić
  Aldin Šetkić

The following players received entry from the qualifying draw:
  Evgeny Donskoy
  Mislav Hižak
  Matwé Middelkoop
  Filip Prpic

Champions

Singles

 Édouard Roger-Vasselin def.  Karol Beck, 6–7(5), 6–3, 1–0, ret.

Doubles

 Nicolas Mahut /  Édouard Roger-Vasselin def.  Ivan Dodig /  Lukáš Rosol, 7–6(6), 6–7(7), [10–5]

External links
 

BH Telecom Indoors
BH Telecom Indoors
2010 in Bosnia and Herzegovina sport